The mayor of Los Angeles is the chief executive of the Government of Los Angeles as set in the city charter. The current officeholder,  the 43rd in the sequence of regular mayors, is Karen Bass, a member of the Democratic Party, though the office has been nonpartisan since 1909.

When Los Angeles was founded as a small town, a comisionado (Military Commissioner) was appointed before the title was changed to alcalde (Mayor) in 1786. Between 1841 to 1844, there were two mayors called the Jueces de Paz (Justices of Peace). When the United States took control, the office was renamed to Mayor.

The longest serving mayors have been Tom Bradley (1973–1993; 20 years), Fletcher Bowron (1938–1953; 14 years), Sam Yorty (1961–1973; 12 years), and Eric Garcetti (2013–2022; 9 years). The shortest tenures, not counting Acting Mayors, were John Bryson (77 days), Bernard Cohn (14 days), and William Stephens (11 days).

Although the President of the Los Angeles City Council serves as acting mayor when the Mayor is out of the city, only five have served due to a vacancy: Manuel Requena (1855 and 1856), Wallace Woodworth (1860–1861), Bernard Cohn (1878), Niles Pease (1909), and Martin F. Betkouski (1916); only one, Cohn, ascended from Acting Mayor to Mayor. Two Mayors have died during their terms: Henry Mellus and Frederick A. MacDougall.

Los Angeles has had five latino mayors post-incorporation: Antonio F. Coronel, Manuel Requena, Cristobal Aguilar, Antonio Villaraigosa, and Eric Garcetti. The city has also had two African-American mayors, Tom Bradley and Karen Bass. Two French-Canadian politicians, Damien Marchesseault and Prudent Beaudry, have served as Mayors. The first woman to serve as Mayor is Karen Bass, who was elected in 2022.

Spanish era (1781–1821)
The office of Alcalde, the Mayor of El Pueblo de la Reina de los Ángeles, was elected annually, without the right to reelection for two years. With the incomplete nature of records from the Spanish colonial period of Los Angeles, only the first year of 1781 is certain.

Comisionado

Alcalde

Notes

Mexican era (1821–1848)
In 1821, Los Angeles became under Mexican rule, and the city continued having an alcalde. The inaugural holder was Abel Stearns, an American trader who came to California in 1829 from Massachusetts.

First & Second Alcalde
In 1839, instead of one alcalde, two officials served as First and Second Alcalde.

Jueces de Paz (Justices of Peace)
In 1841, the office of alcalde was abolished, instead being replaced by two Jueces de Paz (Justice of the peace).

First & Second Alcalde
In 1844, the office of alcalde was restored, reverting back to its 1839 posts.

American Territorial era (1848–1850)
Between the Interim government of California and California's statehood, the Mayor was appointed by the Governor of California in 1848 and was elected in 1850. 

Notes

Post-incorporation (1850–present) 

 Notes

Appendices

Mayoral terms and term limits
At the office's creation in 1850, mayors served one year terms. In 1889, the dates were change to be on even-numbered years, with the term extending to two years per term; the first election in an even-numbered year was in 1892. In 1909, the city charter changed the election years to odd-numbered years with the March 1909 election, originally slated to be a recall election against Arthur C. Harper. In 1993, voters amended the city charter to implement term limits to elected officials, including mayor. In 2015, voters passed a charter amendment that would change the election dates to align with gubernatorial and presidential elections on even-numbered years; the first mayoral election after this change was in 2022.

Interrupted terms 
Eight mayors have had interrupted terms: Stephen Clark Foster (1855 and 1856), Henry Mellus (1860), Cristobal Aguilar (1867), Frederick A. MacDougall (1878), John Bryson (1889), Arthur C. Harper (1909), Charles E. Sebastian (1916), and Frank L. Shaw (1938).

See also 

Mayor of Los Angeles
History of Los Angeles
Pueblo de Los Angeles
Los Angeles Pobladores

References

External links 

Office of Mayor website 
City of Los Angeles Officials Database

 
Los Angeles
Los Angeles-related lists